"Grammy Family"  is the second single from DJ Khaled's debut album, Listennn... the Album. The single features and was written by Kanye West, Consequence and John Legend; Jon Brion assisted West in producing the track. As well as being featured on Khaled's album, the song appears on Consequence's album Don't Quit Your Day Job! (2007). The track's beat was sampled and rapped over by J. Cole on his debut mixtape The Come Up (2007).

Composition
"What the World Is Coming To" by Dexter Wansel is directly sampled throughout the hip hop song. As well as this, a riff from "You've Made Me So Very Happy" by Lou Rawls is made sample of throughout. Furthermore, West quotes his own lyrics from Late Registration track "Celebration" when rapping: "It's a celebration bitches".

Track listing
CD single
 "Grammy Family" (Clean) – 3:26
 "Grammy Family" (Explicit) – 3:26
 "Grammy Family" (Instrumental) – 3:26

Commercial performance
On the week that it was officially released as a single, "Grammy Family" debuted and peaked at number 24 on the US Bubbling Under R&B/Hip-Hop Singles chart.

Charts

References

2006 singles
DJ Khaled songs
Kanye West songs
Consequence (rapper) songs
John Legend songs
Song recordings produced by Kanye West
Songs written by Kanye West
Songs written by Consequence (rapper)
Songs written by John Legend